Lanesville is an unincorporated area in the town of New Milford, Litchfield County, Connecticut, United States.

History
The establishment of what we now consider Lanesville is marked by the construction of the area's first gristmill, on the Still River in 1717. For a time, the area was known as "Pleasant Valley"  but was eventually named Lanesville after prominent resident Jared Lane. In the nineteenth century, Lanesville was a well-known district with a post office, one-room schoolhouse, and railroad depot.

Geography

There has been limited access to the area since 2008, when the town closed off Lanesville Road from US Route 7. This closure pleased the residents of Lanesville but left businesses struggling. The area is now almost completely residential as a result. Traffic is also blocked on the other end of Lanesville Rd, where there are barriers to the bridge connecting Lanesville with Franks Ln and Harrybrook Park.

Parks and recreation
Harrybrook Park
Lovers Leap State Park

References 

 New Milford, Connecticut
 Populated places established in 1717